The Edwards Islands are a group of islands in the east side of Amundsen Bay, about  southwest of Mount Oldfield in Enderby Land. They were plotted from air photos taken from Australian National Antarctic Research Expeditions aircraft in 1956, and were named by the Antarctic Names Committee of Australia for T. Edwards, an assistant diesel mechanic at Wilkes Station in 1960.

See also 
 List of Antarctic and sub-Antarctic islands

References 

Islands of Enderby Land